Chandler is a lunar impact crater in the northern hemisphere, on the Moon's far side. It lies to the southeast of the large walled plain D'Alembert, and southeast of the slightly smaller Chernyshev crater.

This is a heavily worn and eroded crater that is now essentially a wide, irregular depression in the rugged lunar surface. Attached to the outer south-southwest rim is the slightly smaller but equally worn Chandler P. Multiple small craters lie along the rim and inner wall of Chandler, but the northern part of the rim has been nearly obliterated by a cluster of small impacts. There is also seemingly a chain of impacts that run across the crater midpoint, with a double impact in the western half and a chain of three impacts in the eastern half. The remainder of the floor is somewhat irregular, with multiple tiny craters and a pair of small impacts near the southern rim.

Satellite craters
By convention these features are identified on lunar maps by placing the letter on the side of the crater midpoint that is closest to Chandler.

Further reading
 
 
 
 
 
 
 
 
 
 
 
 

Impact craters on the Moon